Codec acceleration describes computer hardware that offloads the computationally intensive compression or decompression. This allows, for instance, a mobile phone to decode what would generally be a very difficult, and expensive video to decode it with no stuttering, and using less battery life than un-accelerated decoding would have taken. Similar acceleration is used on a broad variety of other appliances and computers for similar reasons. What could take a general purpose processor 100 Watts to decode on a general purpose processor, could take 10W on a graphics processing unit, and even less on a dedicated hardware codec.

Video codec acceleration
Video codec acceleration is where video (usually including audio as well) encoding and decoding is accelerated in hardware.

Audio codec acceleration
Audio codec acceleration is where audio encoding and decoding is accelerated in hardware.

See also
 iDCT
 Motion compensation
 Discrete cosine transform (DCT)
 Quantization
 Variable-length code
 Information theory - Entropy
 DirectX Video Acceleration
 High-Definition Video Processor
 Intel Clear Video
 Nvidia PureVideo
 Unified Video Decoder
 Video Immersion
 Video Processing Engine

Video acceleration
Video compression
Sound technology